Anthony Joseph Kaseta (September 9, 1923 – January 19, 1995) was a Lithuanian-American professional basketball center who played one season in the Professional Basketball League of America (PBLA) and one season in the National Basketball League (NBL). Kaseta was born in Michigan and during his youth lived with his mother and two older siblings in Detroit. During his career, he played for the Grand Rapids Rangers (PBLA, 1947–48) and the Detroit Vagabond Kings (NBL, 1948–49).

References

1923 births
1995 deaths
American men's basketball players
United States Army Air Forces personnel of World War II
American people of Lithuanian descent
Basketball players from Detroit
Centers (basketball)
Detroit Vagabond Kings players
Professional Basketball League of America players
People from Hamtramck, Michigan
Northern High School (Detroit, Michigan) alumni
Sportspeople from Wayne County, Michigan